SYR2: Slaapkamers met slagroom is an EP by American alternative rock band Sonic Youth. It was released on 12" vinyl on September 2, 1997, and was the second in a series of experimental and mostly instrumental releases issued on the band's own SYR label.

Background 

SYR2 followed the band's tradition of having the liner notes of SYR releases written in foreign languages, in this case, Dutch. "Slaapkamers met slagroom" is Dutch for "bedrooms with whipped cream".

An error in the original production of the vinyl resulted in a small number of the initial pressings accidentally being on black vinyl. It is unknown how many of these were produced. After realizing this, the remaining production of the vinyl version was on clear blue vinyl.

An abbreviated version of the instrumental 17-minute title composition (with added vocals courtesy of Kim Gordon) appeared on the group's 1998 album A Thousand Leaves as the song "The Ineffable Me". Additionally, a melody from "Stil" was fleshed out to create the song "Snare, Girl", also from A Thousand Leaves.

Track listing

Personnel 
Sonic Youth

 Thurston Moore
 Kim Gordon
 Lee Ranaldo
 Steve Shelley

Technical

 Wharton Tiers – engineering
 Greg Calbi – mastering
 Chris Habib – sleeve design

References

External links 

 

1997 EPs
Sonic Youth EPs
Experimental rock EPs
Noise rock EPs
Sonic Youth Recordings albums